Simar Nature Reserve is a nature reserve in Pwales Valley, in Xemxija, St Paul's Bay, Malta. An artificial wetland habitat was created in the 1990s by BirdLife Malta volunteers in an area of abandoned marshland.

The reserve lies within the Is-Simar Special Protection Area, which has been a Ramsar Wetland of International Importance since 1996, a protected bird sanctuary since 2006 and a Site of Community Importance since March 2008.

See also
Chadwick Lakes
Buskett Gardens

References

Simar
Ramsar sites in Malta
St. Paul's Bay